Reductive amination (also known as reductive alkylation) is a form of amination that involves the conversion of a carbonyl group to an amine via an intermediate imine. The carbonyl group is most commonly a ketone or an aldehyde. It is considered the most important way to make amines, and a majority of amines made in the pharmaceutical industry are made this way.

Reaction process
In this organic reaction, the amine first reacts with the carbonyl group to form a hemiaminal species, which subsequently loses one molecule of water in a reversible manner by alkylimino-de-oxo-bisubstitution, to form the imine. The equilibrium between aldehyde/ketone and imine can be shifted toward imine formation by removal of the formed water through physical or chemical means. This intermediate imine can then be isolated and reduced with a suitable reducing agent (e.g., sodium borohydride). This method is sometimes called indirect reductive amination.

In a separate approach, imine formation and reduction can occur sequentially in one pot. This approach, known as direct reductive amination (Borch reaction), employs reducing agents that only react slowly (or not at all) with the ketone/aldehyde precursors. These hydride reagents also must tolerate moderately acidic conditions. Typical reagents that meet these criteria include sodium cyanoborohydride (NaBH3CN) and sodium triacetoxyborohydride (NaBH(OCOCH3)3).  These reactions are generally conducted at pH ~ 5, typically using a weak acid (e.g., acetic acid) as a catalyst.  Under these conditions, the reaction of the carbonyl and amine results in formation of a small amount of the iminium ion (R1R2C=N+R3R4), which is reduced much more readily than the carbonyl starting material.   As a result, the selective reduction of the iminium takes place to give the amine (rather than direct reduction of the carbonyl to form the alcohol).

Variations and related reactions 
This reaction is related to the Eschweiler–Clarke reaction, in which amines are methylated to tertiary amines, the Leuckart–Wallach reaction, or by other amine alkylation methods such as the Mannich reaction and Petasis reaction.

A classic named reaction is the Mignonac reaction (1921) involving reaction of a ketone with ammonia over a nickel catalyst for example in a synthesis of 1-phenylethylamine starting from acetophenone:

Nowadays, one-pot reductive amination fulfil by acid-metal catalysts that act as a hydride transfer. Much research study on this kind of reaction show high efficiency.

In industry, tertiary amines such as triethylamine and diisopropylethylamine are formed directly from ketones with a gaseous mixture of ammonia and hydrogen and a suitable catalyst.

Biochemistry
In biochemistry, dehydrogenase enzymes can catalyze the reductive amination of α-keto acids and ammonia to yield α-amino acids. Reductive amination is predominantly used for the synthesis of the amino acid glutamate starting from α-ketoglutarate, while biochemistry largely relies on transamination to introduce nitrogen in the other amino acids.

In popular culture
In the critically acclaimed drama Breaking Bad, main character Walter White uses the reductive amination reaction to produce his high purity methamphetamine, relying on phenyl-2-propanone and methylamine. The phenyl-2-propanone (otherwise known as phenylacetone or P2P) is produced from phenylacetic acid and acetic acid using a tube furnace and thorium dioxide (ThO2) as a catalyst.

See also
 Forster–Decker method
 Leuckart reaction

References

External links 
 Current methods for reductive amination
 Industrial reductive amination at BASF

Organic redox reactions